835 Naval Air Squadron was a former squadron of the Royal Navy's Fleet Air Arm originally formed in February 1942 as a torpedo bomber and reconnaissance unit flying Fairey Swordfish. In June 1943, six Sea Hurricanes were added to the squadron as a fighter flight. The composite unit exchanged the Hurricanes in September 1944 for Grumman Wildcats, serving on until 1 April 1945, when the squadron disbanded.

History

1942

The first members of the squadron assembled at the Royal Naval Air Station (RNAS) Eastleigh (also known as HMS Raven) in January 1942 near Southampton in Hampshire. They left Eastleigh on 29 January to board the SS Andalucia Star at Glasgow. Andalucia Star sailed from Glasgow on 4 February and arrived in Kingston, Jamaica on 17 February. 835 Naval Air Squadron officially formed that day at Palisadoes (HMS Buzzard), Jamaica as a torpedo-bomber and reconnaissance squadron of Fairey Swordfish. After patrolling the seas around Jamaica until 12 March 1942, the squadron moved to Norfolk, Virginia, where a refitted  lay waiting to take them aboard. Furious left Norfolk on 3 April 1942, and arrived at RNAS Lee-on-Solent (HMS Daedalus), Hampshire, on 15 April. The squadron moved to RNAS Hatston (HMS Sparrowhawk), Orkney, Scotland, in June 1942. December saw temporary return to RNAS Machrihanish before relocation to RAF Kirkistown, County Down, Northern Ireland.

1943

Return to RNAS Machrihanish on 29 January 1943 caused the base to be nicknamed "Clapham Junction" by the squadron. Carrier embarkation was aboard  on 8 April 1943 for convoy duties, but the squadron returned to RNAS Machrihanish for RP-3 Rocket Projectile training on 7 May. After a short return to Battler, the squadron moved to RAF Ballykelly, County Londonderry, Northern Ireland on 15 May and to RNAS Eglington (HMS Gannet) on 22 May. In June 1943, 835 Squadron was reinforced with a flight of six Sea Hurricane Mk.IIcs from 804 squadron.

1944

The squadron transferred to the escort carrier  on 31 December 1943, and returned ashore at RNAS Hatston and RNAS Machrihanish (HMS Landrail) in January 1944. Most of 1944, however, was spent onboard Nairana, on Atlantic convoy duties and on the Gibraltar Run. The squadron also served in 1944 with a successful submarine Hunter-Killer Group in the North Atlantic under the overall command of Captain Frederick Walker. Three Ju 290s were shot down in May and June. The squadron became involved in the Murmansk Convoys to and from RNAS Hatston in August. Squadron pilots faced the most dangerous flying conditions of the war to attack two U-Boats and shoot down four enemy aircraft in the Arctic. The aging Sea Hurricanes were replaced by Grumman Wildcat Mk.VIs in September.

1945

The squadron of 14 Swordfish and six Grumman Wildcats was led by Lieutenant-Commander Val Jones, a Swordfish Observer. The Senior Pilot of the squadron was Lieutenant Allen Burgham, DSC, MiD, who flew Sea Hurricane Mk.IIcs and later Wildcat Mk.VIs, and was Flight Commander of the Fighter Component. Lt-Commander John Godley RNVR, who had previously been in command of 'P' Flight of 836 Naval Air Squadron, became commander of the squadron on 9 January 1945.

Lieutenant-Commander Godley served as Squadron Commanding Officer for one Murmansk Convoy in February 1945. 835 Squadron saw further combat doing two coastal anti-shipping raids along the Norwegian coast off Trondheim, before being disbanded on 1 April 1945 at RNAS Hatston, with its fighter flight transferring to 821 Naval Air Squadron. Lieutenant-Commander Godley was transferred to command 714 Naval Air Squadron.

Aircraft operated

Squadron bases
{|class="wikitable"
|+Air stations and carriers used by 835 Naval Air Squadron FAA, data from
! From !! To !! Base !! Remark
|-
|1 January 1942 || 29 January 1942 || RNAS Eastleigh (HMS Raven), Hampshire ||
|-
|29 January 1942 || 17 February 1942 || colspan=2|En route to Jamaica
|-
|17 February 1942 || 12 March 1942 || Palisadoes (HMS Buzzard), Kingston, Jamaica ||
|-
|12 March 1942 || 2 April 1942|| colspan=2|''En route to Norfolk, Virginia|-
|3 April 1942 || 15 April 1942 ||  ||
|-
|15 April 1942 || June 1942 || RNAS Lee-on-Solent (HMS Daedalus), Hampshire ||
|-
|June 1942 || 21 September 1942 || RNAS Hatston (HMS Sparrowhawk), Orkney, Scotland ||
|-
|22 September 1942 || 28 October 1942 || RNAS Stretton (HMS Blackcap), Cheshire ||
|-
|29 October 1942 || 12 November 1942 || RNAS Machrihanish (HMS Landrail), Argyll, Scotland ||
|-
|13 November 1942 || 27 November 1942 ||  ||
|-
|28 November 1942 || 18 December 1942 || RNAS Machrihanish (HMS Landrail), Argyll, Scotland ||
|-
|18 December 1942 || 29 January 1943 || RAF Kirkistown, County Down, Northern Ireland ||
|-
|29 January 1943 || 8 April 1943 || RNAS Machrihanish (HMS Landrail), Argyll, Scotland ||
|-
|9 April 1943 || 7 May 1943 ||  ||
|-
|7 May 1943 || 14 May 1943 || RNAS Machrihanish (HMS Landrail), Argyll, Scotland ||
|-
|14 May 1943 || 15 May 1943 || HMS Battler ||
|-
|15 May 1943 || 22 May 1943 || RAF Ballykelly, County Londonderry, Northern Ireland ||
|-
|22 May 1943 || 4 June 1943 || RNAS Eglington (HMS Gannet), County Londonderry, Northern Ireland ||
|-
|4 June 1943 || 28 June 1943 || HMS Battler || Detachment at RNAS Eglington, County Londonderry, Northern Ireland
|-
|28 June 1943 || July 1943 || RNAS Eglington (HMS Gannet), County Londonderry, Northern Ireland ||
|-
|July 1943 || 30 July 1943 || HMS Battler ||
|-
|30 July 1943 || 6 November 1943 || RAF Ayr, Ayrshire, Scotland ||
|-
|9 September 1943 || 6 November 1943 ||  || Sea Hurricane flight
|-
|9 September 1943 || 6 November 1943 ||  || part of Swordfish flight
|-
|6 November 1943 || 27 November 1943 ||  ||
|-
|27 November 1943 || 16 December 1943 || RNAS Abbotsinch (HMS Sanderling), Renfrewshire, Scotland ||
|-
|16 December 1943 || 30 December 1943 || RNAS Eglington (HMS Gannet), County Londonderry, Northern Ireland ||
|-
|31 December 1943 || January 1944 ||  ||
|-
|January 1944 || 24 February 1944 || RNAS Hatston (HMS Sparrowhawk) and RNAS Machrihanish (HMS Landrail) ||
|-
|24 February 1944 || 6 March 1944 || HMS Nairana ||
|-
|6 March 1944 || 8 March 1944 || RAF Gibraltar ||
|-
|8 March 1944 || 15 March 1944 || HMS Nairana ||
|-
|15 March 1944 || 17 March 1944 || RNAS Abbotsinch (HMS Sanderling), Renfrewshire, Scotland ||
|-
|17 March || 5 April 1944 || HMS Nairana ||
|-
|5 April 1944 || 10 April 1944 || RAF Gibraltar ||
|-
|10 April 1944 || 17 April 1944 || HMS Nairana ||
|-
|17 April 1944 || 13 May 1944 || RNAS Abbotsinch (HMS Sanderling), Renfrewshire, Scotland ||
|-
|13 May 1944 || 4 July 1944|| HMS Nairana ||
|-
|4 July 1944 || 13 August 1944 ||RNAS Burscough (HMS Ringtail), Lancashire ||
|-
|13 August 1944 || 14 September 1944 || HMS Nairana ||
|-
|14 September 1944 || 14 October 1944 || RNAS Yeovilton (HMS Heron), Somerset ||
|-
|14 October 1944 || 29 October 1944 || HMS Nairana ||
|-
|29 October 1944 || 2 November 1944 || Murmansk, Russia ||
|-
|2 November 1944 || 9 November 1944 || HMS Nairana ||
|-
|9 November 1944 || 30 November 1944 || RNAS Machrihanish (HMS Landrail), Argyll, Scotland ||
|-
|30 November 1944 || 20 December 1944 || HMS Nairana ||
|-
|20 December 1944 || 27 December 1945 || RAF Ayr, Ayrshire, Scotland ||
|-
|27 December 1944 || 5 January 1945 || HMS Nairana ||
|-
|5 January 1945 || 22 January 1945 || RNAS Machrihanish (HMS Landrail), Argyll, Scotland ||
|-
|22 January 1945 || 29 January 1945 || HMS Nairana ||
|-
|29 January 1945 || 5 February 1945 || RNAS Hatston (HMS Sparrowhawk), Orkney, Scotland ||
|-
|5 February 1945 || 28 February 1945 || HMS Nairana ||
|-
|28 February 1945 || 26 March 1945 || RNAS Hatston (HMS Sparrowhawk), Orkney, Scotland ||
|-
|26 March 1945 || 29 March 1945 || HMS Nairana ||
|-
|29 March 1945 || 1 April 1945 || RNAS Hatston (HMS Sparrowhawk), Orkney, Scotland ||
|}

Commanding officers

See also
 List of Fleet Air Arm aircraft squadrons

References
Notes

Bibliography

 Barringer, E.E. "Alone on a Wide, Wide Sea" London: Leo Cooper, 1995. .
 Kilbracken, John. Bring Back My Stringbag: Swordfish Pilot at War, 1940–1945. London: Pen & Sword, 1996. .
 Sadler, George E. Swordfish Patrol''. Wrexham, UK: Bridge Books, 1996. .

External links
 
 
 
 

835 Squadron
Military units and formations established in 1942
Military units and formations disestablished in 1945
Military units and formations of the Royal Navy in World War II